Oberon is a king of the fairies in medieval and Renaissance literature. He is best known as a character in William Shakespeare's play A Midsummer Night's Dream, in which he is King of the Fairies and spouse of Titania, Queen of the Fairies.

Etymology

Oberon is derived from Alberich (from Old High German alb- "elf" and -rîh-, "ruler", "king"), the name of a dwarf from Germanic mythology. In the Nibelungenlied, a Burgundian poem written around the turn of the 13th century, Alberich guards the treasure of the Nibelungen, but is overcome by Siegfried. In Old French, the name Alberich evolved into Alberon and then Auberon and ultimately into Aubrey.

French heroic song
The name Oberon (as Auberon) is first attested to in the early 13th century  entitled , wherein it refers to an elven man of the forest encountered by the eponymous hero. Huon, son of Seguin count of Bordeaux, passed through the forest inhabited by Oberon. He was warned by a hermit not to speak to Oberon, but his courtesy had him answer Oberon's greetings and so gain his aid in his quest. Huon had murdered Charlot, the Emperor's son, in self-defense, and so he must visit the court of the amir of Babylon and perform various feats to win a pardon. He succeeds only with Oberon's aid.

This elf is dwarfish in height, though very handsome. He explains that, at his christening, an offended fairy cursed him to dwarfish height (an example of the wicked fairy godmother folklore motif) but relented and gave him great beauty as compensation. Alberich features as a dwarf in the Nibelungen; the dwarfish height was thus explained.

The real Seguin was Count of Bordeaux under Louis the Pious in 839 and died fighting against the Norsemen in 845. Charles l'Enfant, a son of Charles the Bald, died in 866 of wounds inflicted by a certain Aubouin in the circumstances of an ambush similar to the Charlot of the story. Thus, Oberon appears in a 13th-century French courtly fantasy that is based on a shred of 9th century fact. He is given some Celtic trappings, such as a magical cup (similar to the Holy Grail or the cornucopia) that is ever full for the virtuous. "The magic cup supplied their evening meal; for such was its virtue that it afforded not only wine, but more solid fare when desired", according to Thomas Bulfinch. In this story, he is said to be the child of Morgan le Fay and Julius Caesar.

A manuscript of the romance in the city of Turin contains a prologue to the story of Huon de Bordeaux in the shape of a separate romance of Auberon and four sequels and there are later French versions as well.

Shakespeare saw or heard of the French heroic song through the  translation of John Bourchier, Lord Berners, called Huon of Burdeuxe. In Philip Henslowe's diary, there is a note of a performance of a play Hewen of Burdocize on 28 December 1593.

A Midsummer Night's Dream

In William Shakespeare's A Midsummer Night's Dream, written in 1595/96, Oberon is the king of all of the fairies and is engaged in a dispute with his wife Titania, the fairy queen. They are arguing over custody of a child whom Oberon wants to raise to be his henchman. Titania wants to keep and raise the child for the sake of her mortal friend and follower who died giving birth to him.

Because Oberon and Titania are both powerful spirits connected to nature, their feuding disrupts the weather. Titania describes the consequences of their fighting:

Oberon tricks Titania into giving him back the child using the juice from a special flower that makes you "madly dote upon the next live thing that it sees". The flower was accidentally struck by Cupid's arrow when he attempted to shoot a young maiden in a field, instead infusing the flower with love. Oberon sends his servant, Puck, to fetch the flower, which he does successfully.

Furious that Titania will not give him the child, he puts juice from a magical flower into her eyes while she is asleep. The effect of the juice will cause Titania to fall in love with the first live thing she sees upon awakening. Titania awakens and finds herself madly in love with Bottom, an actor from the rude mechanicals whose head was just transformed into that of a donkey, thanks to a curse from Puck.

Meanwhile, two couples have entered the forest: lovers Hermia and Lysander are pursued by Demetrius, who also loves Hermia, and Helena, who loves Demetrius. Oberon witnesses Demetrius rejecting Helena, admires her amorous determination, and decides to help her. He sends Puck to put some of the juice in Demetrius's eyes, describing him as “a youth in Athenian clothing”, to make him fall in love with Helena. Puck finds Lysander – who is also a youth wearing Athenian clothing – and puts the love potion on Lysander's eyes. When Lysander wakes, he sees Helena first and falls in love with her. Meanwhile, Demetrius has also been anointed with the flower and awakes to see Helena, pursued by Lysander, and a fight breaks out between the two young men. Oberon is furious with Puck and casts a sleeping spell on the forest, making Puck reverse the potion on Lysander, admonishing Puck to not reverse the effects on Demetrius. Both couples awake and begin the journey back to Athens.

Oberon now looks upon Titania and her lover, Bottom, and feels sorry for what he has done. He reverses the spell using a magic herb. When she wakes, she is confused, thinking that she had a dream. Oberon explains that the dream was real and the two reunite happily. They then return to Athens in the epilogue to bless the couples, becoming once again the benevolent fairy king and queen.

Other historical and cultural references
 Oberon is a character in The Scottish History of James IV, a play written  by Robert Greene.
 In 1610, Ben Jonson wrote a masque of Oberon, the Faery Prince. It was performed by Henry Frederick Stuart, the Prince of Wales, at the English court on New Year's Day, 1611.
 Oberon is a main character in Michael Drayton's narrative poem Nimphidia (1627) about the fairy Pigwiggin's love for Queen Mab and the jealousy of King Oberon.
 In the anonymous book Robin Goodfellow, His Mad Pranks and Merry Jests (1628) Oberon is known as "Obreon" and is the father of the half-fairy Robin Goodfellow by a human woman.
 Christoph Martin Wieland first published his epic poem Oberon in 1780; it in turn became the basis (as indicated on the title page) for the German opera Huon and Amanda (Hüon und Amande in German), later known as Oberon, by Sophie Seyler. A plagiarized version of Seyler's opera called Oberon by Karl Ludwig Giesecke with music by Paul Wranitzky debuted in Vienna shortly afterwards. Both operas enjoyed popularity. After extensive performances of the Giesecke version at the coronation of Leopold II in Frankfurt in 1791, it was much performed in Europe until it was surpassed in popularity by Weber's opera Oberon.
 Oberon and Titania are main characters in the 1789 Danish opera Holger Danske, with music by F.L.Æ. Kunzen and libretto by Jens Baggesen.
 Johann Wolfgang Goethe included the figures from Shakespeare's work in Faust I. Oberon is married to Titania, and the couple are celebrating their golden wedding anniversary in Faust I.
 In 1826, Carl Maria von Weber's opera, Oberon, (written after a poem by Christoph Martin Wieland translated to an English libretto by James Robinson Planche) debuted at Covent Garden in London, England.
 Oberon appears with Titania in Richard Dadd's unfinished painting, The Fairy Feller's Master-Stroke, displayed in the Tate Museum.
Two main characters in John Crowley’s Little, Big, a 1981 multi-generational novel about a family’s interaction with the fae, are named Auberon.

A fanciful etymology was given for the name Oberon by Charles Mackay in his book The Gaelic Etymology of the Languages of Western Europe along with many other theories on words found in the English language that have not found mainstream acceptance.

In popular culture
 On January 11, 1787 William Herschel discovered both the outermost major satellite of Uranus, along with its overall largest. In 1852, his son John Herschel named them Oberon and Titania, respectively.
 In 1830, botanist John Lindley named a flowering plant in the family Orchidaceae, Oberonia after the fairy king. 
 Oberon is mentioned in the lyrics of "Astronomy Domine" on  Pink Floyd's 1967 debut album, Piper at the Gates of Dawn in 1967, though as a reference to the Uranian moons.
 Oberon is referenced in the song "The Fairy Feller's Master-Stroke" on the rock band Queen's 1974 album, Queen II.
 Lucifer's Friend recorded the track "Thus Spoke Oberon" for the 1974 album Banquet.
 In 1984, the thrash metal band Metal Church released the album Metal Church, containing the song "Metal Church". In the song, Oberon is alluded to as the god of heavy metal music.
 Oberon, usually accompanied by Titania, appears regularly in the Megami Tensei series.
 In the animated series Gargoyles, Oberon appears as king of the "Third Race," who are also called "Oberon's Children." He forbids his subjects to interfere with mortal affairs, but becomes antagonistic himself when the protagonists disobey him. 
 Roger Zelazny's Chronicles of Amber begins with Oberon as the missing father of Corwin, the main character.
 Oberon Ale is a flagship American wheat ale brewed by Bell's Brewery in Michigan.
 In Andrzej Sapkowski book series The Witcher, Auberon is an Elven-king and carries the title "The King of Alders".
 Oberon has appeared as a Pretender-class servant in the video game Fate/Grand Order, where he is designed by Chica Umino and voiced by Toshiyuki Toyonaga.
 In the video game Castlevania: Symphony of the Night, the protagonist, Alucard, can obtain and use a sword called the Firebrand. The description for the sword reads "Fire Sword of Oberon".
 In the Dresden Files, Oberon was involved in a love triangle between Mab and Titiana, the Winter and Summer Queens.
 In the manga and anime The Ancient Magus' Bride, which aired from October 2017 to March 2018, the King of the Fairies is named Oberon and his wife, the Queen of the Fairies, is named Titania.
 In the Book Series by author Kevin Hearne, The Iron Druid Chronicles  Oberon is the Irish Wolff Hound companion to the present-day version of ancient druid Atticus O'Sullivan and they share clever and fun conversations as well as adventures together.
 In the game Warframe, both Oberon and Titania appear as equippable Warframes.

References

External links

 
 The Gaelic Etymology of Western Europe, Charles McKay LL.D. 1877: "Oberon"

Fictional characters introduced in the 13th century
Characters in A Midsummer Night's Dream
Fairy royalty
Fictional kings
Male Shakespearean characters
Matter of France
Supernatural legends